Holland Library, now home to Alexandria Bay Chamber of Commerce, is a historic library building located at Alexandria Bay in Jefferson County, New York. It is constructed of Theresa-Alexandria Bay red sandstone. It served as a library until 1998, when it was occupied by the Chamber of Commerce.

It was listed on the National Register of Historic Places in 2002.

References

External links
Welcome to Your 1000 Islands NY Guide - Alexandria Bay Chamber of Commerce

Library buildings completed in 1899
Libraries on the National Register of Historic Places in New York (state)
Buildings and structures in Jefferson County, New York
1899 establishments in New York (state)
National Register of Historic Places in Jefferson County, New York